The Slovak Philharmonic or Slovak State Philharmonic (Slovenská filharmónia) is a Slovak symphony orchestra based in Bratislava. Founded in 1949, the orchestra has resided since the 1950s in the Baroque era Reduta Bratislava concert hall constructed in 1773. 

The current chief conductor of the orchestra is Daniel Raiskin, since the start of the 2020–2021 season.

Principal conductors 
 Václav Talich (1949–1952)
 Ľudovít Rajter (1949–1952)
 Tibor Frešo (1952–1953)
 Ľudovít Rajter conductor (1953–1976)
 Ladislav Slovák (1961–1981)
 Libor Pešek (1981–1982)
 Vladimir Verbitsky (1982–1984)
 Bystrík Režucha (1984–1989)
 Aldo Ceccato (1990–1991)
 Ondrej Lenárd (1991–2001)
 Jiří Bělohlávek (2003–2004)
 Vladimír Válek (2004–2007)
 Peter Feranec (2007–2009)
 Emmanuel Villaume (2009–2016)
 James Judd (2017–2020)
 Daniel Raiskin (2020-present)

References

External links 
 
 Slovak Philharmonic Online Archive

Culture in Bratislava
Musical groups established in 1949
Slovak orchestras
Buildings and structures in Bratislava
1949 establishments in Czechoslovakia